Cowley International College, formerly Cowley Language College and originally Cowley School, is an 11-18 secondary school located on Cowley Hill, in Windle, St Helens, Merseyside.

History

Grammar school
A former part of the school was on Cowley Hill Lane. There were two grammar schools, the Cowley Girls' Secondary Grammar School (also known as the Cowley Girls' School) with around 650 girls, and Cowley Boys' Secondary Grammar School (also known as Cowley School) with around 550 boys. In 1965, the St Helens Education Committee council introduced proposals for comprehensive education.

The changing rooms at the boys' school, and the gym at the girls' school were used as locations for the film Chariots of Fire (1981).

Comprehensive
The comprehensive plans took effect in September 1970 with each school becoming a 13-18 single sex comprehensive school - the Cowley Boys' School and Cowley Girls' School which soon became 11-18 schools in 1974 with around 700 at each school. For a short time from 1976–78, these schools were the Cowley High School for Boys and the Cowley High School for Girls. By 1978 it had become the Cowley High School with around 1,400 boys and girls.

In 2001, it gained Language College specialist status and changed its name. In the summer of 2010 the school changed its name once again to Cowley International College.

New building
The school has recently been subject to a £20 million redevelopment, with a new building for the 11-16 site opened in October 2009 by Ed Balls, Head of Education. The previous site is currently being redeveloped into a state-of-the-art Sixth Form which opened to students in September 2010.

Notable former pupils

Cowley School (Grammar, High and College)
 Sir Hugh Stott Taylor (1890-1974), Professor of Chemistry, Princeton University
 Walter H. Longton First World War flying ace
 George Groves (1901-1976), sound engineer
 Winifred Frost (1902-1979), freshwater biologist
 Sir Harold Macdonald Steward (1904-1977), consulting engineer and Conservative Party politician
 Jack Heaton (1912–1998), rugby player
 Robert Dorning (1913-1989), actor, musician
 Gerry Pickavance (1915-1991), director of the Rutherford High Energy Lab
 Theo Barker (1923-2001), professor of economic and social history
 Geoff Duke (1923-2015), racing motorcyclist during the 1950s
 Ray French (born 1939), rugby player and commentator
 Margaret Chapman (1940-2000), artist and illustrator
 Geoff Pimblett (born 1944), rugby player
 Gary Stretch (born 1965), boxer
 Tim Jonkers (born 1981), rugby player
 James Roby (born 1985), rugby player
 Adam Swift (born 1993), rugby player

Notable masters
 Leonard Brockington (1888-1966), Classics and English Master at the School, later the first head of the Canadian Broadcasting Corporation
 Isaac Shapiro (1904-2004), lecturer in English at Birmingham University
 Watcyn Thomas (1906–77), a Welsh rugby union player
 Roland Mathias (1915-2007), poet
 Viv Harrison (1921-1989), teacher and rugby player
 Derek Norcross (1930-2006), later headmaster of St Paul's Church of England School (East Sussex), Deputy Lieutenant of East Sussex
 Ray French (born 1939), BBC rugby league commentator, also taught at the school
 Mike Bennett (rugby league)

References

External links
 EduBase

Secondary schools in St Helens, Merseyside
Community schools in St Helens, Merseyside